Rose Hill is a city in Butler County, Kansas, United States.  As of the 2020 census, the population of the city was 4,185.

History

Early history

For many millennia, the Great Plains of North America was inhabited by nomadic Native Americans.  From the 16th century to 18th century, the Kingdom of France claimed ownership of large parts of North America.  In 1762, after the French and Indian War, France secretly ceded New France to Spain, per the Treaty of Fontainebleau.

19th century
In 1802, Spain returned most of the land to France.  In 1803, most of the land for modern day Kansas was acquired by the United States from France as part of the 828,000 square mile Louisiana Purchase for 2.83 cents per acre.

In 1854, the Kansas Territory was organized, then in 1861 Kansas became the 34th U.S. state.  In 1855, Butler County was established within the Kansas Territory, which included the land for modern day Rose Hill.

The first post office in Rose Hill was established in 1874.  Rose Hill was founded in 1892.

Geography
Rose Hill is located at  (37.5583517, -97.1350405).

Demographics

2010 census
As of the census of 2010, there were 3,931 people, 1,288 households, and 1,045 families living in the city. The racial makeup of the city was 95.5% White, 0.3% African American, 0.8% Native American, 0.7% Asian, 0.5% from other races, and 2.3% from two or more races. Hispanic or Latino of any race were 2.9% of the population.

There were 1,288 households, of which 46.3% had children under the age of 18 living with them, 67.5% were married couples living together, 10.0% had a female householder with no husband present, 3.6% had a male householder with no wife present, and 18.9% were non-families. 15.0% of all households were made up of individuals, and 6.5% had someone living alone who was 65 years of age or older. The average household size was 2.99 and the average family size was 3.33.

The median age in the city was 35.4 years. 30.7% of residents were under the age of 18; 8% were between the ages of 18 and 24; 26.1% were from 25 to 44; 25.7% were from 45 to 64; and 9.5% were 65 years of age or older. The gender makeup of the city was 49.1% male and 50.9% female.

2000 census
As of the census of 2000, there were 3,432 people, 1,039 households, and 906 families living in the city. The racial makeup of the city was 96.91% White, 0.26% African American, 0.67% Native American, 0.41% Asian, 0.12% Pacific Islander, 0.35% from other races, and 1.28% from two or more races.  1.81% of the population were Hispanic or Latino of any race.

There were 1,039 households, out of which 59.4% had children under the age of 18 living with them, 74.5% were married couples living together, 9.9% had a female householder with no husband present, and 12.8% were non-families. 11.3% of all households were made up of individuals, and 3.7% had someone living alone who was 65 years of age or older. The average household size was 3.25 and the average family size was 3.51.

In the city, the population was spread out, with 37.7% under the age of 18, 6.6% from 18 to 24, 33.4% from 25 to 44, 17.0% from 45 to 64, and 5.3% who were 65 years of age or older. The median age was 31 years. For every 100 females, there were 99.7 males. For every 100 females age 18 and over, there were 91.6 males.

As of 2000 the median income for a household in the city was $75,040. Males had a median income of $47,019 versus $31,082 for females. The per capita income for the city was $20,221. About 2.6% of families and 3.3% of the population were below the poverty line, including 4.1% of those under age 18 and 11.6% of those age 65 or over.

Education
The community is served by Rose Hill USD 394 public school district.

Rose Hill High School is a 4A high school with an enrollment of 610 students. Rose Hill High School is located on the southern edge of Rose Hill. Students moved into the current facility in October 1995. Rose Hill High School offers a general education program alongside several dual-credit college college courses and early associate degree programs offered by the wing of Butler Community College attached at the southeast end. Rose Hill High School sponsors a wide range of student activities for the purpose of providing students with additional opportunities to develop into leaders and citizens. Also as of 2005 Rose Hill High School has become one of the few schools in Kansas to give a laptop to every pupil in the school.

Notable people
 Kendall Gammon, American football player
 Josh Swindell, Baseball player

References

Further reading

External links

 City of Rose Hill
 Rose Hill - Directory of Public Officials
 Rose Hill city map, KDOT

Cities in Kansas
Cities in Butler County, Kansas
Wichita, KS Metropolitan Statistical Area